Huda Beauty is a cosmetics line that was launched in 2013 by Huda Kattan.  Her older sister, Alya Kattan, initially helped her by financially contributing to the setup of the business. Huda Kattan was chosen as one of "The 25 Most Influential People on the Internet" by Time in 2017, and she was listed as one of The Richest Self-Made Women and one of the Top Three Beauty Influencers by Forbes.

Background
In April 2010, Huda Kattan started a beauty blog and a YouTube channel, both of them called "Huda Beauty". She launched a cosmetic line named after her channel in 2013. 

Kattan's channels are beauty tutorials focusing on topics such as makeup techniques and skincare routines. Huda Kattan has been called "a Kim Kardashian West of the beauty influencer economy" due to their similarities in looks, family-run businesses, and influence.

Launch
The first Huda Beauty product was a collection of false eyelashes released through Sephora in Dubai in 2011, and the United States in 2015. The Kardashian sisters were reported to use Huda Beauty lashes, providing an early publicity boost to the label. According to Forbes, the company as a business is valued at over a billion dollars.

In December 2017, the company received a minority investment from TSG Consumer Partners, a private equity firm that had previously invested in beauty brands such as Smashbox and IT Cosmetics.

Products
Huda Beauty offers more than 140 products online or in-store. The beauty brand has launched an entire range of products including lipsticks, highlighter and contour palettes, false lashes, and a collaborative product with Tweezerman. Huda Beauty's Samantha Lashes #7, since launch, has been ranked as one of the best-selling and highly reviewed lash products.

In 2018, all launched products brought in at least $200 million in annual revenue. Time described this as being part of “an internet-based beauty brand age”, as internet-to-business beauty products have taken over a large percentage of the traditional beauty market.

Awards and recognition 
In 2016, Huda Kattan was awarded the Digital Innovator of the Year award in the category of prestige beauty by Women’s Wear  and in 2021, she won the Entrepreneurial Gamechanger of the Year award from Glamour Magazine. Huda Beauty's false eyelashes won the Best False Lashes award by the wedding magazine The Knot in 2017. Kattan was named as one of Time Magazine's 25 Most Influential People Online, alongside J.K Rowling and Kim Kardashian West.

Controversies and criticism

Genital lightening
Huda Beauty faced intense disagreement over a blog post advising women about ways to lighten the color of their genitals. Originally published on April 7, 2018, the post named ”Why Your Vagina Gets Dark And How To Lighten It" noted some tips from "trusted expert" and board-certified dermatologist Doris Day, MD. This post was criticized as unprofessional and misleading.

Allegations of copying

Foundation vs Fenty Beauty's 
In 2017, Huda Beauty announced that it would soon be debuting a foundation collection with a more diverse range of shades. Following this announcement, the collection was criticized by Fenty Beauty followers that “it copies Fenty Beauty’s "Pro Filt'r" foundation collection image”. Huda Beauty's "#FauxFilter" foundations have a selection of 30 shades, while Rihanna's brand - Fenty Beauty "Pro Filt'r" foundation collection has 40 shades. Others, however, applauded Huda Beauty for being one of the first brands to release an inclusive range of shades in Sephora stores globally.

Acne scar controversy 
In 2015, a YouTuber from the UK, Em Ford, posted a video named “You Look Disgusting”. The video discussed negative comments she had received about her appearance, and, as of October 2018, the video had been viewed more than 28 million times. There was a post from Huda that has been blamed for shaming other peer YouTubers’ acne scars. Kattan had posted a comment stating the only thing worse than a breakout is an acne scar. Huda had used Ford's positive post to show “how ugly” the acne scars could be. After seeing Huda's post, Em Ford made a new post questioning if Huda, as a popular brand, wants to be one of the bullying problems or one of the solutions. This ended with Kattan's replies to the posts and an apology online.

Neon Obsessions Lawsuit 
In 2022, Huda Beauty was accused for use of disapproved substances around the eye by the US Food and Drug Administration. A US lawsuit filed by consumers claimed that the Neon Obsessions palette by Huda Beauty concealed the prohibited ingredients by hiding warning labels such as “not intended for the eye area”. A California federal judge approved a $1.93 million settlement to resolve the claims and $1.2 million in legal fees for the plaintiffs.

Marketing
According to the Instagram scheduling tool HopperHQ, which publishes an 'influencer rich list' estimating the value and income of internet influencers, Kattan could potentially earn up to AED 66,000 per sponsored post as the owner of Huda Beauty.

Huda Beauty is among the best-selling cosmetics brands in Sephora in the Middle East and Harrods in London. According to The Business of Fashion, Kattan's background as a second-generation Iraq immigrant in America distinguishes her from other beauty influencers. She studied Finance in the United States, and pursued a career as a makeup artist in Dubai.

Fragrances
In 2018, Huda Beauty stated that they were entering the skincare and fragrance markets and announced a new collection of perfume.

Philanthropy 
2020

 June 2020: After the murder of George Floyd, Huda Beauty donated $500,000 to the NAACP.
 June 2020: Huda Beauty supported Doctors Without Borders (MSF) by matching the donations made through the Huda Beauty website, with their donation totaling $150,000 dollars in matched funds to the Doctors Without Borders COVID-19 Relief Fund 

2021

 March 2021: Huda Kattan & Huda Beauty starts petition for beauty brands to disclose when they've retouched or edited their images or videos. Encouraging women & men to love themselves, dismantling toxic social media beauty standards
March 2021: Huda Beauty stands up against racism against the Asian community, donates to Stop AAPI Hate
 April 2021: In Ramadan, Huda Beauty donated one million meals to the 100 Million Meals food drive initiative, which was launched by Mohammed bin Rashid Al Maktoum to provide food parcels to disadvantaged communities across 20 countries in Asia and Africa
 May 2021: Huda Beauty used their platforms to speak up about the forced evictions in Palestine and pushes 'biggest launch of the year' due to this and donates $100,000 dollars to Médecins Sans Frontières (Doctors Without Borders) to support their efforts on the ground
 May 2021: Huda Kattan & Huda Beauty donated $100,000 dollars to Help India Breathe, a COVID-19 relief fundraiser launched by former monk Jay Shetty and his wife, Radhika Devlukia-Shetty

References

External links
 Official Website

Cosmetics brands